In quantum mechanics, the position operator is the operator that corresponds to the position observable of a particle.

When the position operator is considered with a wide enough domain (e.g. the space of tempered distributions), its eigenvalues are the possible position vectors of the particle.

In one dimension, if by the symbol  we denote the unitary eigenvector of the position operator corresponding to the eigenvalue , then,  represents the state of the particle in which we know with certainty to find the particle itself at position .

Therefore, denoting the position operator by the symbol  in the literature we find also other symbols for the position operator, for instance  (from Lagrangian mechanics),  and so on we can write  for every real position .

In quantum mechanics, the ordered (continuous) family of all Dirac distributions, i.e. the family

is called the (unitary) position basis (in one dimension), just because it is a (unitary) eigenbasis of the position operator . Note that even though this family is ordered by the continuous coordinate , the cardinality of this basis set is Aleph nought, instead of Aleph one. This is because the Dirac distributions in this family are required to be square-integrable (see the relevant section below), which means that the Hilbert space spanned by this basis has countably infinite many basis states. One way to understand this is to treat the Dirac delta functions as the limit of very tiny lattice segments of the continuous position space, and therefore as the lattice spatial period goes to zero, the number of these lattice sites goes to countable infinity.

It is fundamental to observe that there exists only one linear continuous endomorphism  on the space of tempered distributions such that

for every real point . It's possible to prove that the unique above endomorphism is necessarily defined by

for every tempered distribution , where  denotes the coordinate function of the position line defined from the real line into the complex plane by

Introduction

In one dimension for a particle confined into a straight line the square modulus

of a normalized square integrable wave-function

represents the probability density of finding the particle at some position  of the real-line, at a certain time.

In other terms, if at a certain instant of time the particle is in the state represented by a square integrable wave function  and assuming the wave function  be of -norm equal 1,

then the probability to find the particle in the position range  is

Hence the expected value of a measurement of the position  for the particle is the value

where:
 the particle is assumed to be in the state ;
 the function  is supposed integrable, i.e. of class ;
 we indicate by  the coordinate function of the position axis.

The circumflex over the function  on the left side indicates the presence of an operator, so that this equation may be read:

The result of the position operator  acting on any wave function  equals the coordinate function  multiplied by the wave-function .

Or more simply:

The operator  multiplies any wave-function  by the coordinate function .

Note 1. To be more explicit, we have introduced the coordinate function

which simply imbeds the position-line into the complex plane. It is nothing more than the canonical embedding of the real line into the complex plane.

Note 2. The expected value of the position operator, upon a wave function (state)  can be reinterpreted as a scalar product:

assuming the particle in the state  and assuming the function  be of class  which immediately implies that the function  Is integrable, i.e. of class .

Note 3. Strictly speaking, the observable position  can be point-wisely defined as

for every wave function  and for every point  of the real line, upon the wave-functions which are precisely point-wise defined functions. In the case of equivalence classes  the definition reads directly as follows

for every wave-function .

Basic properties 

In the above definition, as the careful reader can immediately remark, does not exist any clear specification of domain and co-domain for the position operator (in the case of a particle confined upon a line). In literature, more or less explicitly, we find essentially three main directions for this fundamental issue.

 The position operator is defined on the subspace  of  formed by those equivalence classes  whose product by the imbedding  lives in the space  as well. In this case the position operator  reveals not continuous (unbounded with respect to the topology induced by the canonical scalar product of ), with no eigenvectors, no eigenvalues, consequently with empty eigenspectrum (collection of its eigenvalues).
 The position operator is defined on the space  of complex valued Schwartz functions (smooth complex functions defined upon the real-line and rapidly decreasing at infinity with all their derivatives). In this case the position operator  reveals continuous (with respect to the canonical topology of ), injective, with no eigenvectors, no eigenvalues, consequently with void eigenspectrum (collection of its eigenvalues).
 This is, in practice, the most widely adopted choice in Quantum Mechanics literature, although never explicitly underlined. The position operator is defined on the space  of complex valued tempered distributions (topological dual of the Schwartz function space ). The product of a temperate distribution by the imbedding  lives always in the space , which contains . In this case the position operator  reveals continuous (with respect to the canonical topology of ), surjective, endowed with complete families of eigenvectors, real eigenvalues, and with eigenspectrum (collection of its eigenvalues) equal to the real line.

Eigenstates

The eigenfunctions of the position operator (on the space of tempered distributions), represented in position space, are Dirac delta functions.

Informal proof. To show that possible eigenvectors of the position operator should necessarily be Dirac delta distributions, suppose that  is an eigenstate of the position operator with eigenvalue . We write the eigenvalue equation in position coordinates,

recalling that  simply multiplies the wave-functions by the function , in the position representation. Since the function  is variable while  is a constant,  must be zero everywhere except at the point . Clearly, no continuous function satisfies such properties, and we cannot simply define the wave-function to be a complex number at that point because its -norm would be 0 and not 1. Q.E.D.

The normalized solution to the equation

is
 or better 

Proof. Here we prove rigorously that

Indeed, recalling that the product of any function by the Dirac distribution centered at a point is the value of the function at that point times the Dirac distribution itself, we obtain immediately

Q.E.D.

Meaning of the Dirac delta wave. Although such Dirac states are physically unrealizable and, strictly speaking, they are not functions, Dirac distribution centered at  can be thought of as an "ideal state" whose position is known exactly (any measurement of the position always returns the eigenvalue ). Hence, by the uncertainty principle, nothing is known about the momentum of such a state.

Three dimensions

The generalisation to three dimensions is straightforward.

The space-time wavefunction is now  and the expectation value of the position operator  at the state  is

where the integral is taken over all space. The position operator is

Momentum space

Usually, in quantum mechanics, by representation in the momentum space we intend the representation of states and observables with respect to the canonical unitary momentum basis

In momentum space, the position operator in one dimension is represented by the following differential operator

where:

Formalism in L2(R, C)

Consider, for example, the case of a spinless particle moving in one spatial dimension (i.e. in a line). The state space for such a particle contains the L2-space (Hilbert space)  of complex-valued and square-integrable (with respect to the Lebesgue measure) functions on the real line.

is pointwise defined by:

for each pointwisely defined square integrable class  and for each real number , with domain

where  is the coordinate function sending each point  to itself.

Since all continuous functions with compact support lie in D(Q), Q is densely defined. Q, being simply multiplication by x, is a self-adjoint operator, thus satisfying the requirement of a quantum mechanical observable.

Immediately from the definition we can deduce that the spectrum consists of the entire real line and that Q has purely continuous spectrum, therefore no discrete eigenvalues.

The three-dimensional case is defined analogously. We shall keep the one-dimensional assumption in the following discussion.

Measurement theory in L2(R, C)

As with any quantum mechanical observable, in order to discuss position measurement, we need to calculate the spectral resolution of the position operator

which is

where  is the so-called spectral measure of the position operator.

We see that the projection-valued measure

Therefore, if the system is prepared in a state , then the probability of the measured position of the particle belonging to a Borel set  is

where  is the Lebesgue measure on the real line.

After any measurement aiming to detect the particle within the subset B, the wave function collapses to either

or

See also

 Position and momentum space
 Momentum operator
 Translation operator (quantum mechanics)

References

Quantum mechanics